Metro Wawrzyszew, located at the corner of Kasprowicza and Lindego Street, became the 20th working station on Line M1 of the Warsaw Metro when it opened on 25 October 2008 as part of the extension from Słodowiec to Młociny. It was designed by Polish architect Andrzej M. Chołdzyński.

Gallery

References

External links

Railway stations in Poland opened in 2008
Line 1 (Warsaw Metro) stations
Bielany